Chouk may refer to:

Choukachou, Beninese millet beer
Çük, Tatar holiday